Charles Mulberger (November 1, 1873 – November 17, 1931) was an American politician, businessman, and lawyer from Watertown, Wisconsin.

Background 
Born in Watertown on November 1, 1873, son of Henry Mulberger Sr. and Mathilda Wolf Mulberger, attended the local public schools and Watertown High School. He graduated from University of Wisconsin Law School in 1894. He was the manager of Global Milling Company for twenty years.

Public office 
He served four years on Watertown's Common Council, and four as president of the city fire and police commission, and was mayor of Watertown from 1915 to 1921, a title previously held by his father (Henry Mulberger, Sr.) and two of his brothers, Henry Jr. and Arthur (whom he succeeded). In 1914, Mulberger was elected to the Wisconsin State Senate from Wisconsin's 33rd State Senate district (Jefferson and Waukesha counties) as a Democrat, with 5,890 votes, to 5,157 for Republican Frank Foote, 61 for Prohibitionist J. A. McKenzie, and 28 for Socialist Gus. Voight. (Republican incumbent George E. Hoyt was not a candidate.) He was assigned to the standing committee on corporations. He was re-elected in 1918, with 5,294 votes to 1,014 for Socialist George Neu. He moved to the committee on state affairs, and to the committee on committees. He gained statewide attention as the author of the 1919 "Mulberger Act", which provided for enforcement of the Prohibition Amendment, but legalized the sale of near beer with up to 2.75% alcohol content (the latter provision was eventually defeated in court). In 1922, he was defeated by Republican John C. Schumann, who drew 10,865 votes to Mulberger's 3,794.

Mulberger ran once more for mayor of Watertown, but came in third in a tight three-way race, with 1271 votes to 1461 for J. E. McAdams and 1406 for A. H. Hartwig. In 1928, he was the Democratic nominee for Wisconsin Secretary of State, losing to incumbent Republican Theodore Dammann, who drew 627,244 votes to 232,797 for Mulberger, 36,734 for Socialist Leo Krzycki, 6,517 for Prohibitionist W. C. Pickering, and 1,510 for Peter Ordanoff of the Workers' Party.

Later years 
Mulberger continued to live in the family home at 311 S. Washington Street (now part of the South Washington Street Historic District. He had suffered a severe stroke in 1927, but continued in the occasional practice of law. He died November 16, 1931, of apoplexy, leaving a widow not named in his obituaries.

Notes

1873 births
1931 deaths
Politicians from Watertown, Wisconsin
University of Wisconsin Law School alumni
Businesspeople from Wisconsin
Wisconsin lawyers
Mayors of places in Wisconsin
Wisconsin city council members
Democratic Party Wisconsin state senators